Morawiecki (feminine Morawiecka) is a Polish surname. Notable people with the surname include:

 Jarosław Morawiecki (born 1964), Polish former ice hockey player and coach
 Kornel Morawiecki (1941–2019), Polish activist
 Mateusz Morawiecki (born 1968), Polish politician, current prime minister of Poland

See also
 

Polish-language surnames
Polish toponymic surnames
Ethnonymic surnames